The Ten Lost Tribes were the ten of the Twelve Tribes of Israel that were said to have been exiled from the Kingdom of Israel after its conquest by the Neo-Assyrian Empire  BCE. These are the tribes of Reuben, Simeon, Dan, Naphtali, Gad, Asher, Issachar, Zebulun, Manasseh, and Ephraim; all but Judah and Benjamin (as well as some members of Levi, the priestly tribe, which did not have its own territory). The Jewish historian Josephus (37–100 CE) wrote that "there are but two tribes in Asia and Europe subject to the Romans, while the ten tribes are beyond Euphrates till now, and are an immense multitude, and not to be estimated by numbers".

In the 7th and 8th centuries CE, the return of the lost tribes was associated with the concept of the coming of the messiah. Claims of descent from the "lost tribes" have been proposed in relation to many groups, and some religions espouse a messianic view that the tribes will return.

Historians have generally concluded the deported tribes assimilated into the local population, and some of those who remained formed the Samaritan community. However, this has not stopped various religions from asserting that some survived as distinct entities. Zvi Ben-Dor Benite, a professor of Middle Eastern history, states: "The fascination with the tribes has generated, alongside ostensibly nonfictional scholarly studies, a massive body of fictional literature and folktale." Anthropologist Shalva Weil has documented various differing tribes and peoples claiming affiliation to the Lost Tribes throughout the world.

Scriptural basis

 
The scriptural basis for the idea of lost tribes is : "In the ninth year of Hoshea, the king of Assyria took Samaria, and carried Israel away unto Assyria, and placed them in Halah, and in Habor, on the river of Gozan, and in the cities of the Medes."

According to the Bible, the Kingdom of Israel and Kingdom of Judah were the successor states to the older United Monarchy of Israel. The Kingdom of Israel came into existence c. 930 BCE after the northern tribes of Israel rejected Solomon's son Rehoboam as their king. Nine tribes formed the Kingdom of Israel: the tribes of Reuben, Issachar, Zebulun, Dan, Naphtali, Gad, Asher, Ephraim, and Manasseh.

The tribes of Judah and Benjamin remained loyal to Rehoboam, and formed the Kingdom of Judah. In addition, members of the Tribe of Levi were located in cities in both kingdoms.

In c. 732 BCE, the Assyrian king Tiglath-Pileser III sacked Damascus and Israel, annexing Aramea and territory of the tribes of Reuben, Gad and Manasseh in Gilead including the desert outposts of Jetur, Naphish, and Nodab. People from these tribes were taken captive and resettled in the region surrounding Khabur River. Tiglath-Pilesar also captured the territory of Naphtali and the city of Janoah in Ephraim, and an Assyrian governor was placed over the region of Naphtali.

Israel Finkelstein estimated that only a fifth of the population (about 40,000) were actually resettled out of the area during the two deportation periods under Tiglath-Pileser III, Shalmaneser V and Sargon II. Many also fled south to Jerusalem, which appears to have expanded in size fivefold during this period, requiring a new wall to be built, and a new source of water (Siloam) to be provided by King Hezekiah. Furthermore,  explicitly mentions northern Israelites who had been spared by the Assyrians—in particular, members of Dan, Ephraim, Manasseh, Asher, and Zebulun—and how members of the latter three returned to worship at the Temple in Jerusalem at that time.

The story of Anna on the occasion of the Presentation of Jesus at the Temple in the New Testament names her as being of the (lost) tribe of Asher (Luke 2:36).

The Hebrew Bible does not use the phrase "ten lost tribes", leading some to question the number of tribes involved.  states that the kingdom would be taken from Solomon and ten tribes given to Jeroboam:

Biblical apocrypha
According to historian Zvi Ben-Dor Benite:

Centuries after their disappearance, the ten lost tribes sent an indirect but vital sign ... In 2 Esdras, we read about the ten tribes and "their long journey through that region, which is called Arzareth" ... The book of the "Vision of Ezra", or Esdras, was written in Hebrew or Aramaic by a Jew in Israel sometime before the end of the first century CE, shortly after the destruction of the temple by the Romans [in 70 CE]. It is one of a group of texts later designated as the so-called Apocrypha—pseudoepigraphal books – attached to but not included in the Hebrew biblical canon.

Views

Judaism
The Talmud debates whether or not the ten lost tribes will eventually be reunited with the Tribe of Judah; that is, with the Jewish people:
The ten tribes will not eventually return, as is said: "He sent them to another land as it is this day", just as the day departs and does not return, similarly they depart and do not return - according to Rabbi Akiva. Rabbi Eliezer says: "as it is this day" - just as this day grows dark and then bright again, so too the ten tribes who have been darkened will eventually be brightened [i.e. they will return]. ... Rabbi Shimon ben Yehuda of the village of Akko says in the name of Rabbi Shimon: If their deeds remain "as this day" [i.e. they continue to sin], they will not return; otherwise they shall return.

An Ashkenazi Jewish legend speaks of these tribes as Die Roite Yiddelech, "the little red Jews", who were cut off from the rest of Jewry by the legendary river Sambation, "whose foaming waters raise high up into the sky a wall of fire and smoke that is impossible to pass through."

Christianity
To varying degrees, Apocryphal accounts concerning the Lost Tribes, based on biblical accounts, have been produced by Jews and Christians since at least the 17th century. An increased currency of tales relating to lost tribes that occurred in the 17th century was due to the confluence of several factors. According to Tudor Parfitt:
As Michael Pollack shows, Menasseh's argument was based on "three separate and seemingly unrelated sources: a verse from the book of Isaiah, Matteo Ricci's discovery of an old Jewish community in the heart of China and Antonio Montezinos' reported encounter with members of the Lost Tribes in the wilds of South America".

In 1649, Menasseh ben Israel published his book, The Hope of Israel, in Spanish and Latin in Amsterdam; it included Antonio de Montezinos' account of the Lost Tribes in the New World. An English translation was published in London in 1650. In it, Menasseh argued that the native inhabitants of America which were encountered at the time of the European discovery were actually the descendants of the [lost] Ten Tribes of Israel and for the first time, he tried to gain support for the theory from European thinkers and publishers. Menasseh noted how important Montezinos' account was, 

He wrote on 23 December 1649: "I think that the Ten Tribes live not only there ... but also in other lands scattered everywhere; these never did come back to the Second Temple and they keep till this day still the Jewish Religion ..."

In 1655, Menasseh ben Israel petitioned Oliver Cromwell to allow the Jews to return to England in furtherance of the Messianic goal. (Since the Edict of Expulsion in 1290, Jews had been prohibited by law from living in England.) With the approach of 1666, considered a significant date, Cromwell was allegedly interested in the return of the Jews to England because of the many theories circulating related to millennial thinking about the end of the world. Many of these ideas were fixed upon the year 1666 and the Fifth Monarchy Men who were looking for the return of Jesus as the Messiah; he was expected to establish a final kingdom to rule the physical world for a thousand years. Messianic believers supported Cromwell's Republic in the expectation that it was a preparation for the fifth monarchy—that is, the monarchy that should succeed the Babylonian, Persian, Greek, and Roman world empires.

Latter-day Saint Movement

The Book of Mormon is based on the premise that two families of Israelites escaped from Israel shortly before the sacking of Jerusalem by Nebuchadnezzar, constructed a ship, sailed across the ocean, and arrived in the New World. They are among the ancestors of Native American tribes and the Polynesians. Adherents believe the two founding tribes were called Nephites and Lamanites, that the Nephites obeyed the Law of Moses, practiced Christianity, and that the Lamanites were rebellious. Eventually the Lamanites wiped out the Nephites around CE 400, and they are among the ancestors of Native Americans.

The Church of Jesus Christ of Latter-day Saints (LDS Church) believes in the literal gathering of Israel, and the Church actively preaches the gathering of people from the twelve tribes. "Today Israelites are found in all countries of the world. Many of these people do not know that they are descended from the ancient house of Israel," the church teaches in its basic Gospel Principles manual. "The Lord promised that His covenant people would someday be gathered .... God gathers His children through missionary work. As people come to a knowledge of Jesus Christ, receiving the ordinances of salvation and keeping the associated covenants, they become 'the children of the covenant' (3 Nephi 20:26)."

The church also teaches that 

One of their main Articles of Faith, which was written by Joseph Smith, is as follows: "We believe in the literal gathering of Israel and in the restoration of the Ten Tribes; that Zion (the New Jerusalem) will be built upon the American continent; that Christ will reign personally upon the earth; and, that the earth will be renewed and receive its paradisiacal glory." (LDS Articles of Faith #10)

Regarding the Ezekiel 37 prophecy, the church teaches that the Book of Mormon is the stick of Ephraim (or Joseph) mentioned and that the Bible is the stick of Judah, thus comprising two witnesses for Jesus Christ. The church believes the Book of Mormon to be a collection of records by prophets of the ancient Americas, written on plates of gold and translated by Joseph Smith c. 1830. The church considers the Book of Mormon one of the main tools for the spiritual gathering of Israel.

Historical view
Mainstream scholars suggest that while deportations took place both before and after the destruction of Israel (722-720 BCE), they were less significant than the Bible's account of them indicates. During the earlier Assyrian invasions, the Transjordan and the Galilee did witness large-scale deportations, and entire tribes were lost; the tribes of Reuben, Gad, Dan, and Naphtali are never mentioned again. The region of Samaria, on the other hand, was larger and more populous. Two of the region's largest cities, Samaria and Megiddo, were mostly left intact, and the rural communities were generally left alone. Additionally, according to the Book of Chronicles, King Hezekiah of Judah invited the survivors of Ephraim, Zebulun, Asher, Issachar and Manasseh to Jerusalem to celebrate Passover. Therefore, it is assumed that the majority of people who survived the Assyrian invasions remained in the area. According to researchers, the Samaritan community of today, which claims to be descended from Ephraim, Manasseh, Levi, and, up until 1968, also Benjamin, does in fact predominantly derive from the tribes that continued to live in the region. It has been proposed that some Israelites joined the southern tribes in the Kingdom of Judah, however, this theory is debated. The Israelites who were deported are thought to have assimilated with the local populace. 

For instance, the New Standard Jewish Encyclopedia states: "In historic fact, some members of the Ten Tribes remained in the land of Israel, where apart from the Samaritans some of their descendants long preserved their identity among the Jewish population, others were assimilated, while others were presumably absorbed by the last Judean exiles who in 597–586 BCE were deported to Assyria ... Unlike the Judeans of the southern Kingdom, who survived a similar fate 135 years later, they soon assimilated ..."

Search
The enduring mysteries surrounding the disappearance of the tribes later became a source of numerous largely mythological narratives in recent centuries, with historian Tudor Parfitt arguing "this myth is a vital feature of colonial discourse throughout the long period of European overseas empires, from the beginning of the fifteenth century, until the later half of the twentieth". Along with Prester John, they formed an imaginary for exploration and contact with uncontacted and indigenous peoples in the Age of Discovery and colonialism.

However, Parfitt's other research indicated some possible ethnic links between several older Jewish Diaspora communities in Asia and Africa and the Middle East, especially those established in pre-colonial times. For example, in his Y-DNA studies of males from the Lemba people, Parfitt found a high proportion of paternal Semitic ancestry, DNA that is common to both Arabs and Jews from the Middle East.

His later genetic studies of the Bene Israel of India, the origins of whom were obscure, also concluded that they were predominantly descended from males from the Middle East, largely consistent with their oral histories of origin. These findings subsequently led other Judaising groups, including the Gogodala tribe of Papua New Guinea, to seek help in determining their own origins.

Ethnology and anthropology
Expanded exploration and study of groups throughout the world through archaeology and the new field of anthropology in the late 19th century led to a revival or a reworking of accounts of the Lost Tribes. For instance, because the Mississippian culture's complex earthwork mounds seemed to be beyond the skills of the Native American cultures which were known to European Americans at the time of their discovery, it was theorized that the ancient civilizations which were involved in the mounds' construction were linked to the Lost Tribes. They tried to fit new information which they acquired as the result of archaeological findings into a biblical construct. However, the earthworks across North America have been conclusively linked to various Native groups, and today, archaeologists consider the theory of non-Native origin pseudo-scientific.

Groups which claim descent from the Lost Tribes

Pashtuns of Afghanistan and Pakistan

Among the Pashtuns, there is a tradition of being descended from the exiled lost tribes of Israel. This tradition was referenced in 19th century western scholarship and it was also incorporated in the "Lost Tribes" literature which was popular at that time (notably George Moore's The Lost Tribes of 1861).
Recently (2000s), interest in the topic has been revived by the Jerusalem-based anthropologist Shalva Weil, who was quoted in the popular press as stating that the "Taliban may be descended from Jews".

The traditions surrounding the Pashtuns being the remote descendants of the "Lost Tribes of Israel" are to be distinguished from the historical existence of the Jewish community in eastern Afghanistan or northwest Pakistan which flourished from about the 7th century to the early 20th century, but has essentially disappeared from the region due to emigration to Israel since the 1950s.

Mughal-era historiography

According to the Encyclopaedia of Islam, the theory of Pashtun descent from Israelites can be traced to Makhzan-e-Afghani, a history book which was compiled for Khan-e-Jehan Lodhi in the reign of the Mughal Emperor Jehangir in the 17th century.

Modern findings
The Pashtuns are a predominantly Sunni Muslim Iranic people, native to southern Afghanistan and northwestern Pakistan, who adhere to an indigenous and pre-Islamic religious code of honor and culture, Pashtunwali. The belief that the Pashtuns are descended from the lost tribes of Israel has never been substantiated by concrete historical evidence. Many members of the Taliban hail from the Pashtun tribes and they do not necessarily disclaim their alleged Israelite descent.

In Pashto, the tribal name 'Yusef Zai' means the "sons of Joseph".

A number of genetic studies on Jews refute the possibility of a connection, whereas others maintain a link. In 2010, The Guardian reported that the Israeli government was planning to fund a genetic study to test the veracity of a genetic link between the Pashtuns and the lost tribes of Israel. The article stated that "Historical and anecdotal evidence strongly suggests a connection, but definitive scientific proof has never been found. Some leading Israeli anthropologists believe that, of all the many groups in the world which claim to have a connection to the 10 lost tribes, the Pashtuns, or Pathans, have the most compelling case."

Assyrian Jews
Some traditions of the Assyrian Jews claim that Israelites of the tribe of Benjamin first arrived in the area of modern Kurdistan after the Neo-Assyrian Empire's conquest of the Kingdom of Israel during the 8th century BCE; they were subsequently relocated to the Assyrian capital. During the first century BCE, the Assyrian royal house of Adiabene—which, according to the Jewish historian Flavius Josephus, was ethnically Assyrian and whose capital was Erbil (Aramaic: Arbala)—was converted to Judaism. King Monobazes, his queen Helena, and his son and successor Izates are recorded as the first proselytes.

Kashmiri Jews

According to Al-Biruni, the famous 11th-century Persian Muslim scholar: "In former times the inhabitants of Kashmir used to allow one or two foreigners to enter their country, particularly Jews, but at present they do not allow any Hindus whom they do not know personally to enter, much less other people."

François Bernier, a 17th-century French physician and Sir Francis Younghusband, who explored this region in the 1800s, commented on the similar physiognomy between Kashmiris and Jews, including "fair skin, prominent noses," and similar head shapes.

Baikunth Nath Sharga argues that, despite the etymological similarities between Kashmiri and Jewish surnames, the Kashmiri Pandits are of Indo-Aryan descent while the Jews are of Semitic descent.

Bnei Menashe

Since the late 20th century, some tribes in the Indian North-Eastern states of Mizoram and Manipur have been claiming that they are Lost Israelites and they have also been studying Hebrew and Judaism. In 2005, the chief rabbi of Israel ruled that the Bnei Menashe are descended from a lost tribe. Based on the ruling, Bnei Menashe are allowed to immigrate to Israel after they formally convert to Judaism. In 2021 4,500 Bnei Menashe had made aliyah to Israel; 6,000 Bnei Menashe in India hope to make aliyah.

Bene Ephraim

The Bene Ephraim, also called Telugu Jews, claim descent from the tribe of Ephraim. Since the 1980s, they have learned to practice modern Judaism. They say that they traveled from Israel through western Asia: Persia, Afghanistan, Tibet and into China for 1,600 years before arriving in southern India more than 1,000 years ago. They hold a history which they say is similar to that of the shift of Afghan Jews, Persian Jews, Bene Israel, and Bnei Menashe. The community has been visited over the years by rabbis from the chief rabbinate in Israel to study their Jewish tradition and practices. They have sought recognition from many rabbis around the world, and they always practiced their own oral traditions and customs (caviloth), such as: burying the dead; marrying under a chuppah; observing Shabbat and other Jewish festivals, and maintaining a beit din. However, they adopted some aspects of Christianity after the arrival of British Baptist missionaries during the early 19th century although nominally practicing Judaism. Because of the long period in which the people were not practicing Judaism, they did not develop any distinctly identifiable Judæo-Telugu language as other groups did.

Beta Israel of Ethiopia

The Beta Israel ("House of Israel") are Ethiopian Jews, who were also called "Falashas" in the past. Some members of the Beta Israel, as well as several Jewish scholars, believe that they are descended from the lost Tribe of Dan, as opposed to the traditional account of their origins which claims that they are descended from the Queen of Sheba and the Israelite king Solomon. They have a tradition of being connected to Jerusalem. Early DNA studies showed that they were descended from Ethiopians, but in the 21st century, new studies have shown their possible descent from a few Jews who lived in either the 4th or 5th century CE, possibly in Sudan. The Beta Israel made contact with other Jewish communities in the later 20th century. In 1973 Rabbi Ovadia Yosef, then the Chief Sephardic Rabbi, based on the Radbaz and other accounts, ruled that the Beta Israel were Jews and should be brought to Israel; two years later that opinion was confirmed by a number of other authorities who made similar rulings, including the Chief Ashkenazi Rabbi Shlomo Goren.

Igbo Jews

The Igbo Jews of Nigeria variously claim descent from the tribes of Ephraim, Naphtali, Menasseh, Levi, Zebulun and Gad. The theory, however, does not hold up to historical scrutiny. Historians have examined the historical literature on West Africa from the colonial era and they have elucidated that such theories served diverse functions for the writers who proposed them.

Black Hebrew Israelites
The Black Hebrew Israelites are an African American new religious movement who claim to be the descendants of the Ten Lost Tribes. The group believe that, following their displacement, the Ten Lost Tribes migrated to and settled in West Africa and were subsequently enslaved and transported to America in the Transatlantic slave trade; where they were forced to abandon their Jewish culture and adopt Christianity by their white slavemasters. The Black Hebrew Israelites also believe that European Jews do not descend from the original Israelites but are in fact "impostors". For this reason the group is often characterised as antisemitic. They are not recognised as Jews by any major Jewish organisation or the modern State of Israel.

Speculation regarding other ethnic groups

There has been speculation regarding various ethnic groups, which would be regarded as fringe theories.

Japanese people

Some writers have speculated that the Japanese people may be the direct descendants of some of the Ten Lost Tribes. Parfitt writes that "the spread of the fantasy of Israelite origin ... forms a consistent feature of the Western colonial enterprise. ... It is in fact in Japan that we can trace the most remarkable evolution in the Pacific of an imagined Judaic past. As elsewhere in the world, the theory that aspects of the country were to be explained via an Israelite model was introduced by Western agents."

In 1878, Scottish immigrant to Japan Nicholas McLeod self-published Epitome of the Ancient History of Japan. McLeod drew correlations between his observations of Japan and the fulfillment of biblical prophecy: The civilized race of the Aa. Inus,[sic: read Ainus] the Tokugawa and the Machi No Hito of the large towns, by dwelling in the tent or tabernacle shaped houses first erected by Jin Mu Tenno, have fulfilled Noah's prophecy regarding Japhet, "He shall dwell in the tents of Shem."

Jon Entine emphasizes the fact that DNA evidence shows that there are no genetic links between Japanese and Israelite people.

Lemba people

The Lemba people (Vhalemba) of Southern Africa claim to be the descendants of several Jewish men who traveled from what is now Yemen to Africa in search of gold, where they took wives and established new communities. They specifically adhere to religious practices which are similar to those which exist in Judaism and they also have a tradition of being a migrant people, with clues which point to their origin in either West Asia or North Africa. According to the oral history of the Lemba, their ancestors were Jews who came from a place called Sena several hundred years ago and settled in East Africa. Sena is an abandoned ancient town in Yemen, located in the eastern Hadramaut valley, which history indicates was inhabited by Jews in past centuries. Some research suggests that "Sena" may refer to Wadi Masilah (near Sayhut) in Yemen, often called Sena, or alternatively to the city of Sana'a, which is also located in Yemen.

Māori
Some early Christian missionaries to New Zealand speculated that the native Maori were descendants of the Lost Tribes. Some Māori later embraced this belief.

Native Americans

In 1650, an English minister named Thomas Thorowgood, who was a preacher in Norfolk, published a book entitled Jewes in America or Probabilities that the Americans are of that Race, which he had prepared for the New England missionary society. Parfitt writes of this work: "The society was active in trying to convert the Indians but suspected that they might be Jews and realized that it had better be prepared for an arduous task. Thorowgood's tract argued that the native populations of North America were descendants of the Ten Lost Tribes."

In 1652 Hamon L'Estrange, an English author who wrote literary works about topics such as history and theology published an exegetical tract called Americans no Jews, or improbabilities that the Americans are of that Race in response to the tract by Thorowgood. In response to L'Estrange, in 1660, Thorowgood published a second edition of his book with a revised title and a foreword which was written by John Eliot, a Puritan missionary to the Indians who had translated the Bible into an Indian language.

The American diplomat and journalist Mordecai Manuel Noah also proposed the idea that the indigenous peoples of the Americas are descended from the Israelites in his publication The American Indians Being the Descendants of the Lost Tribes of Israel (1837).

That some or all American Indians are part of the lost tribes is suggested by the Book of Mormon (1830) and it is also a popular belief among Latter-day Saints.

Scythian/Cimmerian theories and British Israelism

Adherents of British Israelism and Christian Identity both believe that the lost tribes migrated northward, over the Caucasus, and became the Scythians, Cimmerians and Goths, as well as the progenitors of the later Germanic invaders of Britain.

The theory first arose in England and then it spread to the United States. During the 20th century, British Israelism was promoted by Herbert W. Armstrong, founder of the Worldwide Church of God.

Tudor Parfitt, author of The Lost Tribes: The History of a Myth, states that the proof which is cited by adherents of British Israelism is "of a feeble composition even by the low standards of the genre," and these notions are widely rejected by historians.

In literature
In 1929, Lazar Borodulin published the only  Yiddish science fiction novel,  (On the other side of the Sambation, a scientific and fantastic novel), a novel in the "lost world" genre, written according to a Jewish perspective. In the novel a journalist meets a mad scientist with a ray gun in the land of the Red Jews.

In a 1934 Ben Aronin's adventure novel The Lost Tribe. Being the Strange Adventures of Raphael Drale in Search of the Lost Tribes of Israel, a teenager, Raphael, finds the lost tribe of Dan beyond the Arctic Circle.

See also
 Assyria and Germany in Anglo-Israelism
 Black Hebrew Israelites, African Americans who believe that they are the descendants of the ancient Israelites
 British Israelism
 Christian Identity
 Christianity and Judaism
 Christian Zionism
 French Israelism
 Genetic studies on Jews
 Groups claiming affiliation with Israelites
 History of ancient Israel and Judah
 History of the Jews in Afghanistan
 History of the Jews in Africa
 History of the Jews in Central Asia
 History of the Jews in China
 History of the Jews in India
 History of the Jews in Europe
 History of the Jews in Iran
 History of the Jews in Iraq
 History of the Jews in Japan
 History of the Jews in Kurdistan
 History of the Jews under Muslim rule
 Islamic–Jewish relations
 Jewish culture
 Jewish diaspora
 Jewish ethnic divisions
 Jewish history
 Judaism and Mormonism
 Khazar hypothesis of Ashkenazi ancestry
 Mandaeans
 Mormonism and Pacific Islanders
 Native American people and Mormonism
 Nordic Israelism
 Shavei Israel, an organization which seeks to find "lost Jews".
 Theory of Kashmiri descent from lost tribes of Israel
 Timeline of Jewish history
 United States in Prophecy
 Joseph Wolffa so-called "Eccentric Missionary"
 Who is a Jew?

References

Further reading
 
 
 
 

 
Kingdom of Israel (Samaria)
Medieval legends
Tribes of Israel
Gilead